Sakshi Tanwar is an Indian actress and television presenter.

Early life
Tanwar was born in 1972 or 1973 to Rajendra Singh Tanwar, a retired CBI officer, in a middle-class Rajput family from Alwar, Rajasthan, India. She was educated in many Kendriya Vidyalayas before graduating from Lady Shri Ram College in New Delhi.  Prior to this, in 1990, after completing her pre-university course, she worked as a sales trainee at a five-star hotel. In college, she was the secretary and president of the dramatic society. After graduation, while preparing for the entrance tests to the administrative services and mass communications, she gave an audition for the national broadcaster Doordarshan's film songs based program Albela Sur Mela in 1998; she was selected as the presenter.

Career

After her television debut in 1998 with Albela Sur Mela, Tanwar gained fame for her role of Parvati Agarwal in the soap opera, Kahaani Ghar Ghar Kii. Between 2011 and 2014, she played Priya Kapoor, opposite Ram Kapoor, in Bade Achhe Lagte Hain. In December 2012, she made a third appearance on the reality show Kaun Banega Crorepati.

In the 2016 film Dangal, Tanwar played Daya Kaur, wife of former wrestler Mahavir Singh Phogat (played by Aamir Khan), who trains his daughters to be world-class wrestlers against social odds. Sakshi Tanwar made a comeback on television with Tyohaar Ki Thaali, first telecasted by Epic Channel in February 2018.

Manoj Bajpayee, Neena Gupta, Sakshi Tanwar come together for upcoming thriller 'Dial 100'.

Personal life
In 2018, Sakshi became a single mother when she adopted a nine-month-old baby girl, Dityaa Tanwar.

Filmography

Television

Films

Web series

Awards and recognition

Honours
In 2013, her on-screen pairing with Ram Kapoor was voted India Today's Television's most popular onscreen couple. 
In April 2013, in a survey conducted by Ormax Media, Tanwar featured in Top 5 most trustworthy celebrities.

References

External links

 
 

Living people
Year of birth missing (living people)
Actresses from Rajasthan
Indian television actresses
Indian film actresses
Female models from Rajasthan
Actresses in Hindi television
Kendriya Vidyalaya alumni
People from Alwar
Actresses in Hindi cinema
20th-century Indian actresses
21st-century Indian actresses
Actors from Mumbai